Italians is a 2009 Italian comedy film written and directed by Giovanni Veronesi. For this film Paolo Buonvino	won the  Silver Ribbon for best score. the film also received three nominations at David di Donatello for best score, best sound and best special effects.

Plot 
First segment: Fortunato is a trucker specialized in the transport of luxury vehicles, especially Ferrari, in Saudi Arabia and in other Gulf countries. Tired of a life away from home and in the process of retiring, he accompanies his successor, the young Marcello, for his last trip in Dubai.

Second segment: Giulio Cesare Carminati, a successful Roman dentist, is forced to travel to St. Petersburg for a medical conference that he had organized but which would not want to participate because of the depression in which he fell since his wife's premature death. There he comes into contact with Vito Calzone, an exuberant Sicilian who lives in the Russian city and organizes meetings with  local escorts on behalf of the Italian tourists.

Cast 

Carlo Verdone as Giulio Cesare Carminati
Sergio Castellitto as  Fortunato Polidori 
Riccardo Scamarcio as  Marcello Polidori / Walter Lo Russo
Ksenia Rappoport as  Vera
Dario Bandiera as  Vito Calzone
Valeria Solarino as  Haifa
Remo Girone as  Roviglione
 Elena Presti as  Roviglione's wife
 John Graham Harper as  Mr. Vandenheim
Polina Sidikhina as Natalia

References

External links

Italian comedy films
2009 comedy films
2009 films
Films directed by Giovanni Veronesi
Films set in Saint Petersburg
Films set in Dubai
2000s Italian-language films